"Kiss Me" is a song written and recorded by English singer-songwriter Ed Sheeran along with Justin Franks and Julie Frost for his debut studio album, + (2011) which appeared as the eleventh track. The song was produced by Sheeran and No I.D.

Lyrics
According to Sheeran, the lyrics of the song describes the relationship between two best friends, who fell in love with each other. The boy falls in love first and it takes a while for the girl to feel the same and in the end, she does. The couple are actually the godparents of Sheeran and he explains the meaning behind the song during the 2012 iTunes Festival.

Composition
"Kiss Me" is written in the key of D major with a moderate tempo.

Credits and personnel
Credits taken from Allmusic and +s liner notes.

 Ed Sheeran – vocals, acoustic guitar, electric guitar, songwriting, production
 No I.D. – programming

Charts

Certifications and sales

References

2011 songs
Songs written by DJ Frank E
Songs written by Julie Frost
Songs written by Ed Sheeran
Ed Sheeran songs
Song recordings produced by No I.D.